E 571 is a B-class European route connecting Bratislava in Slovakia to Košice. The route is approximately 403 km long.

Route and E-road junctions
  (on shared signage  D1 then  R1 then  I16, which is a Class 1 road undergoing upgrades to extend  R2)
 Žiar nad Hronom:  
 Zvolen:  

External links 
 UN Economic Commission for Europe: Overall Map of E-road Network (2007)
 International E-road network

International E-road network
Roads in Slovakia